Rockingham County Courthouse may refer to:

 Rockingham County Courthouse (North Carolina)
 Rockingham County Courthouse (Virginia)